The Alsea Formation is a geologic formation in Oregon. It preserves fossils dating back to the Rupelian stage of the Oligocene period.

Fossil content 
The following fossils have been reported from the formation:

Mammals 
 Aetiocetus cotylalveus
 Maiabalaena nesbittae
 Simocetus rayi

Fish 
 Orthechinorhinus davidae

See also 
 List of fossiliferous stratigraphic units in Oregon
 Paleontology in Oregon

References

Bibliography 
 
 
 
 

Paleogene geology of Oregon
Oligocene Series of North America
Rupelian Stage
Whitneyan
Siltstone formations
Mudstone formations
Shallow marine deposits
Paleontology in Oregon
Formations